Liebeslieder  op. 114 is a waltz by Johann Strauss II written in 1852 (not to be confused with Brahms's similarly titled  Liebeslieder Walzer and Neue Liebeslieder). At the time it was conceived, the waltz was titled 'Liebesgedichte' or "Love Poems" and during its first performance, it was even announced as 'Liebesständchen' or "Love Serenade". The first performance was at the famed Vienna Volksgarten on 18 June 1852 under the composer's direction.

'Liebeslieder' stands among the master works of the Strauss Jr., who had, since 1849 an enduringly difficult time convincing the Viennese that his works deserve the attention it sought. The fierce and uncompromising Viennese critic Eduard Hanslick was even captivated by this waltz by writing in the journal "Wiener Zeitung" the following extract "Those bad-tempered old-fashioned people, whose narrow-mindedness goes far as to call today's dance music contemptible should be serenaded with ashaming generosity by the 'Liebeslieder' of the young Johann Strauss."

By essence, the waltz is a love serenade of sorts in 3/4 time. The waltz starts quietly with pizzicato on the strings section of the orchestra before a full-bodied 'forte' signals the beginning of the waltz sections. The first theme is that of a yearning feeling, before accelerating into a strong melody. The mood of the rest of the piece alternates between lushly romantic moods as well as light-heartedness, with the flute gently serenading the waltz sections 4 and 5. The piece ends dramatically, with a sense of anticipation, on a timpani drumroll and brass flourish.

The waltz also features on many arrangements with a string orchestra as well as a quintet of strings. Curiously, many of these arrangements are labelled as 'Music of the Old Vienna' when played with such an arrangement, as it could be possible that Strauss' melodies in this waltz invokes the feeling of the romance of the Old Vienna.

Trivia
"The Liebeslieder Singers" is the name of the Chorus in Stephen Sondheim and Hugh Wheeler's musical A Little Night Music.

References

Waltzes by Johann Strauss II